A statue of Thomas Ruffin was installed in Raleigh, North Carolina, United States. The memorial was removed in July 2020.

See also

 List of monuments and memorials removed during the George Floyd protests

References

Buildings and structures in Raleigh, North Carolina
Monuments and memorials in North Carolina
Sculptures of men in North Carolina
Statues in North Carolina
Statues removed in 2020